Michael Stasis is the musical project of Michael Bostock (born September 26, 1986). Born and raised in Pennsylvania, he now lives and records in Los Angeles. He has been writing and recording songs since age 13, and has accumulated a catalogue of over 200 tracks. In 2009, Bostock graduated from Cooper Union in New York City with a Bachelor of Fine Arts. There he entered a work-study relationship with music producer Jorge Elbrecht, known for his work in Lansing-Dreiden and Ariel Pink. This relationship has been credited as being a key point in the artist's development. On August 7, 2015 Arbutus Records issued a compilation of Michael Stasis titled "RIP III".

Discography

Studio LPs
2016: Gentle Cycle (Arbutus Records)
2014: Venus Of Soap
2012: Chainsaw
2009: Anger (Natural Resources)
2009: Cassette (Natural Resources)

Studio EPs
2012: My First Bootleg
2011: In The Shadow Of The Dairy Queen
2011: Innernet Blues

Compilations
2018: RIP IV
2015: RIP III (2006-2014) (Arbutus Records)
2014: RIP II (2010-2014) (Ultrasoft)
2010: RIP (2003-2009)

References

External links 
  Michael Stasis on Arbutus Records
 Michael Stasis on Bandcamp

Musicians from Los Angeles
Living people
Arbutus Records artists
1986 births